Choori Chikkanna is a 1969 Indian Kannada-language film, directed by R. Ramamurthy and produced by R. Ramamurthy. The film stars Rajkumar, Narasimharaju, Dinesh and K. S. Ashwath. The film has musical score by Chellapilla Satyam.

Cast

Dr. Rajkumar
Narasimharaju
Dinesh
K. S. Ashwath
Nagappa
Keshavamurthy
Ganapathi Bhat
B. Narayana Rao
Srikantaswamy
Shyam
Judo Rathnam
Jippi Krishna
Ramamurthy
Jayanthi
B. V. Radha
Jayakumari
Vijayalalitha

Soundtrack
The music was composed by Chellapilla Satyam.

References

External links
 

1969 films
1960s Kannada-language films
Films scored by Satyam (composer)
Films directed by R. Ramamurthy